Mason Locke Weems (October 11, 1759 – May 23, 1825), usually referred to as Parson Weems, was an American minister, evangelical bookseller and author who wrote (and rewrote and republished) the first biography of George Washington immediately after his death. Some of the popular apocryphal stories about Washington can be traced to Weems, including the cherry tree tale ("I cannot tell a lie, I did it with my little hatchet"). That bestseller depicted Washington's virtues and was intended to provide a morally instructive tale for the youth of the young nation.

Early life

Mason Weems was born on October 11, 1759, in Anne Arundel County, Maryland, the youngest of nineteen children. His family traced their ancestry to Scotland. When he was ten years old, his parents sent him away to study at the Kent County Free School in Chestertown, Maryland (which later became Washington College). During the 1770s, Weems studied medicine in Edinburgh, then in the 1780s after a religious conversion, Weems studied theology in London.

Minister and traveling bookseller

Returning to the new United States, and with the help of John Adams and Benjamin Franklin, Weems was ordained in the Episcopal Church. In 1784, he became the rector All Hallows Parish, in his native Anne Arundel County, and also served as chaplain of a school for girls, and preached to local African Americans. He soon began disseminating prayer books, as well as established a charitable society to relieve widows and orphans. However, his tendencies toward Methodism (whose ministers were itinerant) proved unpopular with his bishop, Thomas John Claggett, so by 1792 Weems resigned as rector and began a traveling ministry, which included selling books on behalf of Mathew Carey, a prominent Philadelphia publisher who had emigrated from Ireland to flee persecution based on his Catholic faith.

In 1795 Weems married Frances Ewell, the daughter of prominent local patriot and planter Jesse Ewell (1734-1805) and established a household in Dumfries, Virginia. He had a small bookstore in Dumfries that now houses the Weems–Botts Museum, but continued to travel extensively, particularly in the Mid-Atlantic states and South, a market previously dominated by British booksellers, selling books and preaching.

Dumfries is not far from Pohick Church, part of Truro Parish, in Lorton, Virginia, where both George Washington and his father Augustine had worshiped in pre-Revolutionary days. Weems occasionally preached at Pohick Church, but later inflated this Washington connection and promoted himself as the former "rector of Mount-Vernon parish". In fact, Washington had provided an invaluable endorsement to what would be Weems' first bestselling pamphlet, condemning partisanship shortly before the former President's death, The Philanthropist: or a Good Twenty-Five Cents Worth of Political Love Powder, for Honest Adamites and Jeffersonists. In 1792 and 1793, Weems received Washington's endorsement of his first publishing venture, a two-volume edition of sermons by Hugh Blair, and would receive other endorsements from later presidents, as well as prominent local figures. Furthermore, Weems learned from his interaction with bishop Claggett. When Virginia's evangelically-oriented bishop William Meade complained about Weems selling works by confirmed atheist Thomas Paine, Weems responded that he would only sell it together with Richard Watson's reply, An Apology for the Bible.

Other notable works by Weems include Life of General Francis Marion (1805); Life of Benjamin Franklin, with Essays (1817); and Life of William Penn (1819). Weems also wrote several morality pamphlets, including God's Revenge Against Gambling, Against Duelling, and The Drunkard's Looking Glass. He was an accomplished violinist.

Not long after his father-in-law died in 1805, Weems began managing the Ewell family estate, and by 1808 moved his family within Prince William County to the Ewell family mansion, Bel Air. However, he had debts, so in 1808 sold Carey the copyright to his biography of George Washington for $1000, a sale which he soon regretted. In 1830, Weems owned two slaves, a young man and woman both between 10 and 24 years old. Although Weems continued to travel extensively, Bel Air became his base, where his wife and family lived. 

While traveling in Beaufort, South Carolina, Weems died on May 23, 1825 of unspecified causes. He is buried at Bel Air.

Influence and historical reliability
The New York Times has described Weems as one of the "early hagiographers" of American literature "who elevated the Swamp Fox, Francis Marion, into the American pantheon and helped secure a place there for George Washington".   

Weems's name would probably be forgotten today were it not for the tension between the liveliness of his narratives and what Appletons' Cyclopaedia of American Biography (1889) called "this charge of a want of veracity [that] is brought against all Weems's writings," adding that "it is probable he would have accounted it excusable to tell any good story to the credit of his heroes." The cherry-tree anecdote illustrates this point. Another dubious anecdote found in Weems's biography is that of Washington's prayer during the winter at Valley Forge.

According to the historian James M. McPherson, Weems' biography of George Washington was likely Abraham Lincoln's only exposure to the study of history as a boy. In a lecture given on Lincoln's birthday in 2010 at Washington and Lee University, McPherson explained how Lincoln, as president-elect, had spoken to the Legislature at Trenton, New Jersey near where, on the day after Christmas 1776, the American Revolution had been saved from collapse by Washington's ragged troops. According to McPherson, Lincoln said: "I remember all the accounts in Weems' books of the battlefields and struggles for the liberty of the country and none fixed themselves upon my imagination so deeply as the struggle here at Trenton: the crossing of the river, the contest with the Hessians, the great hardships endured at that time-- all fixed themselves on my memory more than any single revolutionary event. I recollect thinking then, boy even though I was, that there must have been something more than common that those men struggled for."

Exaltation of Washington
The exalted esteem in which the Founding Fathers of the United States, especially George Washington, were held by 19th-century Americans may seem absurd today, but that Washington was so regarded is undisputed. The strength of this esteem can be seen on the ceiling of the United States Capitol Building in the form of Constantino Brumidi's fresco The Apotheosis of Washington.

Weems's A History of the Life and Death, Virtues and Exploits of General George Washington, was a biography written in this spirit, amplified by the florid, rollicksome style that was Weems's trademark. According to this account, his subject was "... Washington, the hero, and the Demigod ..." and at a level above that "... what he really was, [was] 'the Jupiter Conservator,' the friend and benefactor of men." With this hyperbole, Weems elevated Washington to the Augustan level of the god "Jupiter Conservator [Orbis]" (that is, "Jupiter, Conservator of the Empire", later rendered "Jupiter, Savior of the World").

Cherry-tree anecdote

Among the exaggerated or invented anecdotes is that of the cherry tree, attributed by Weems to "... an aged lady, who was a distant relative, and, when a girl, spent much of her time in the family ..." who referred to young George as "cousin".

It went on to be reprinted in the popular McGuffey Reader used by schoolchildren, making it part of American culture, causing Washington's February 22 birthday to be celebrated with cherry dishes, with the cherry often claimed to be a favorite of his.

As early as 1889, in Henry Cabot Lodge's biography of Washington, historians have acknowledged that while there was "nothing intrinsically impossible" about the story, it and other stories recounted by Weems were "on their face hopelessly and ridiculously false."

Cultural references
In 1911 Lawrence C. Wroth published Parson Weems: A Biographical and Critical Study. In this he confronts the fact that Weems is best known for the story of the cherry tree (p. 6) and examines the evidence for its likelihood (pp. 65ff).

Grant Wood painted the scene under the title "Parson Weems' Fable" in 1939. It is among his gently ironic depictions of Americana and shows the parson pulling back a curtain rimmed with cherries to show the story.

Notes

Sources

 A History of the Life and Death, Virtues and Exploits of General George Washington by Mason Locke Weems (abridged)

Further reading

External links
 
  
 Works by Parson Weems at The Online Books Page

1759 births
1825 deaths
People from Anne Arundel County, Maryland
American male writers
19th-century American writers
Writers from Maryland
People from Dumfries, Virginia